William Robert Wight (April 12, 1922 – May 17, 2007)  was an American pitcher in Major League Baseball (MLB)  who played from  through  for the New York Yankees (1946–47), Chicago White Sox (1948–50), Boston Red Sox (1951–52), Detroit Tigers (1952–53), Cleveland Indians (1953, 1955), Baltimore Orioles (1955–57), Cincinnati Reds (1958) and St. Louis Cardinals (1958). He was born in Rio Vista, California.

Wight graduated from Oakland's McClymonds High School and entered professional baseball in the Yankees' organization in 1941. He served in the United States Navy during World War II and missed three full seasons (1943–45).

In a big-league career that lasted all or parts of 12 seasons, Wight posted a 77–99 won–lost record with 574 strikeouts and a 3.95 ERA in 347 appearances, including 198 starts, 66 complete games, 15 shutouts and eight saves in 1,563 innings of work.

Wight scouted for the Houston Colt .45s/Astros and Atlanta Braves for 37 years after his active career ended — signing Baseball Hall of Fame second baseman Joe Morgan for Houston in 1962.  He died in Mount Shasta, California, at the age of 85.

References

External links

1922 births
2007 deaths
Atlanta Braves scouts
Baltimore Orioles players
Baseball players from California
Binghamton Triplets players
Boston Red Sox players
Chicago White Sox players
Detroit Tigers players
Cincinnati Redlegs players
Cleveland Indians players
Houston Astros scouts
Idaho Falls Russets players
Kansas City Blues (baseball) players
Major League Baseball pitchers
New York Yankees players
Norfolk Tars players
People from Solano County, California
St. Louis Cardinals players
San Diego Padres (minor league) players
Seattle Rainiers players
United States Navy personnel of World War II